Carmen Amelia Toaquiza Iza (born 5 October 1995) is an Ecuadorian long-distance runner. She competed in the women's marathon at the 2017 World Championships in Athletics.

References

External links
 

1995 births
Living people
Ecuadorian female long-distance runners
Ecuadorian female marathon runners
World Athletics Championships athletes for Ecuador
Place of birth missing (living people)
Athletes (track and field) at the 2018 South American Games
South American Games bronze medalists for Ecuador
South American Games medalists in athletics
Athletes (track and field) at the 2019 Pan American Games
Pan American Games competitors for Ecuador
21st-century Ecuadorian women